The tenth season of Australian reality television series The Block, titled The Block: Triple Threat, premiered on Tuesday, 27 January 2015 on Nine Network.  Scott Cam (host) and Shelley Craft (Challenge Master) returned from the previous season, as did the three judges: Neale Whitaker, Shaynna Blaze and Darren Palmer.

The Block producer Watercress has lodged an application with Stonnington City Council to extend, reconfigure and renovate a rectangle-shaped, 1970's style, three-level block of flats it bought four months ago for $5.7 million. The Block is located at 27 Darling Street in South Yarra which will be transformed into four north-facing townhouses – some able to enjoy city views from upper levels.

Darren and Deanne Jolly from former The Block: Glasshouse are back to challenge former fan favourites Bec and George Douros and Perth's Kim Owen and Matt Di Costa for one spot for returning players in the 2015 competition.
Six teams of new players will contest a number of challenges, before being whittled down to a final three, who will then go on to renovate an apartment block in South Yarra, with the surviving fan favourite couple.

Former contestant Dan Reilly also returned from seasons 5 and 6, but this time as apprentice foreman, or 'foreboy' under Keith Schleiger.  He was a qualified carpenter, and became a qualified builder before he applied for the role.  He was also brought in to ease the workload on Keith Schleiger, who was reported to be sick and exhausted by the end of the last series.

Former Contestants
The Block: Triple Threat will see the return of three former block couples in challenges for one spot as this season's contestants

Green: This couple won the challenge and became the returning Block couple on The Block: Triple Threat

Red: This couple failed to win the elimination challenge and did not become the returning Block couple.

Challenge Contestants
The Block: Triple Threat will introduce six new teams that will go head to head to receive one of three spots in the competition

Green: This couple won the challenge and became a Block couple on The Block: Triple Threat

Red: This couple failed to win the elimination challenge and did not become a Block couple.

Contestants

The Block-Open House

The Block-Open House is a new format (replacing unlocked) shown once a week which shows former contestants fixing and/or renovating rooms and areas of peoples home into modern looks. It was unsuccessful with ratings and was cancelled after seven episodes.

Score history

Results

Room reveals
This season of The Block had a new room judging. Alongside The Block judges, each week three real estate buyers also judged the rooms and the winner received money towards their apartment

Judges' scores
 Colour key:
  Highest Score
  Lowest Score

Auction

Ratings

Ratings data is from OzTAM and represents the live and same day average viewership from the 5 largest Australian metropolitan centres (Sydney, Melbourne, Brisbane, Perth and Adelaide).

Notes
The winner of weekly room challenge receives a piece of chalk to subtract one point of a couple's score.
The contestants and buyers verdict is a combined score for a cash prize
Sunday episode aired on Monday due to cricket
Josh and Charlotte were disqualified this week due to not using a bed which they created during The Jimmy Possum Challenge in any of their rooms
This week is divided over two weeks due to Easter break

References

2015 Australian television seasons
10